Dwight Glenroy Weakley (born 19 December 1969) is a Bahamian cricketer. Weakley is a right-handed batsman who bowls slow left-arm orthodox and who represents the Bahamas national cricket team in 24 matches.

Weakley made his debut for the Bahamas in the 2002 ICC Americas Championship against the United States.	

Weakley made his Twenty20 debut for the Bahamas against the Cayman Islands in the 1st round of the 2006 Stanford 20/20. He scored 10 runs from 8 balls. Weakley played his second and final Twenty20 match for the Bahamas in the 1st round of the 2008 Stanford 20/20 against Jamaica, where he scored 8 runs from 9 balls, before being dismissed by David Bernard.

Weakley represented the Bahamas in the 2008 ICC World Cricket League Division Five and in the 2010 ICC Americas Championship Division 2.  Weakley will represent the Bahamas in the 2010 ICC Americas Championship Division 1.

References

External links
Dwight Weakley at Cricinfo
Dwight Weakley at CricketArchive

1969 births
Living people
Bahamian cricketers